Race or Die is a MMO car racing game available on the Apple's iOS released in October 2009. It is initially a free application available on the iTunes App Store but users are encouraged to and often buy upgrades.

On October 29, 2013, it was announced that Race or Die will no longer be available for play. "The time has come for us to say goodbye to Race or Die.  For years, Machine Zone games have attracted a very special group of players and we certainly appreciate your participation in the community.  The lifetime of this game has drawn to an end, and now we will be focusing on new ideas and other innovative concepts in the game arena.  We would like to thank everyone who has taken part in this online community."

Features
Race or Die (ROD) features push notifications for 3.0 without extra text messaging charges. Users are notified when raced, are able to invite friends to race and can receive messages friends during the gameplay. ROD also features updates with new missions, cars, car parts, and gifts from the sponsor.  ROD allows users to customize their ride, race other players online with all statistics of wins and losses kept in the user's profile.

Gameplay
In order to play ROD the player must have an iPhone or iPod Touch with a working internet connection and access to the iTunes Store. After downloading the game from the Store and opening the game, the "home" screen appears. The player is immediately awarded "respect points", usually in increments of 10 units. The points can be used to create cash in the game or enhance the users's health, fuel, nitrous or friends on the user's crew. The choices for allocation of these points are found in the "sponsor" screen.

Pro shop
Once the pro shop icon is touched, the game opens to a screen the gives the player three options on how to spend cash: "cars", "performance parts" or "illegal mods". The cars, parts and mods available for purchase become more powerful and expensive as the game progresses. Each of the items is important because the accumulation of each item helps in the "race" section of the game.

Race
Once the race icon is touched, the game opens to a page with a list of 10 other users on an equal experience level. Tapping on the race button next to the users name starts the race. A statistical race is then run and based on the number of cars, parts, mods and crew each user has, a winner is determined.  In many cases the winner acquires cash from the loser as well as being awarded experience points. After the "race" is over, the user is returned to the "list of racers"  and is able to race again.  When a race results in the loser's vehicle being "towed" or "totaled", that user is no longer seen on the list of racers having been replaced by another randomly selected racer/user, presumably from anywhere in the world.
Regardless of the outcome of the race, each race drains the user of nitrous and health; more health is lost when the user/racer loses.  Once below unit 26 in health, the user/racer is sent to the garage for repairs.  The player can pay cash for the repairs or restoration of health, or just simple wait a few minutes.  One unit of health returns every 3 minutes. The user can also go to the sponsor and spend respect points for a full health refill(1 respect point) or a full nitrous refill(5 points).

Crew
One of the most critical components of game play in ROD is the number of users in one's crew.  During each race, members of the player's crew are allowed to race with up to 10 times the level the player is on.  If the user is one level 2, up to 20 crew may accompany the user during the statical race, level 3, up to 30 and so on. Thus one user with same number of cars, parts and mods as another user, but with more crew will prevail in the statistical race, taking cash and experience. 
Crew members are acquired by asking other users to join your crew. The game offers a "location invite" tool  which employs gps and triangulation to find users geographically close by and invites them; or the user can "post" the user's 9 digit friend code and ask other users to punch the code into their "invite friend by code" section. This will notify the user of the invitation, once the user responds, the number of crew members increases at near the top of the home screen.

Estates
Owning Real Estate is the only way to generate recurring Cash Flow Income in Race or Die. Generally, the income from one's properties will significantly exceed that earned from racing or missions. Given the high upkeep of the better cars and the relatively low income from the available properties, it is especially critical that one maximizes their real estate income. The Income provided by real estate is earned every 50 or 60 minutes depending on one's character type. This occurs whether or not the player is actively playing. Upkeep costs are automatically deducted at the same time.

The key to maximizing one's income from Real Estate is understanding the concept of Return on Investment (ROI). If one views real estate as an investment of their cash, then the ROI on that investment is equal to the income provided by that property divided by its current cost. This number is commonly expressed as a percentage and indicates the rate of return for that particular property. When choosing which property to buy, one should always choose the one that provides the highest available ROI in order to maximize their investment and income. The cost of each real estate property increases by 10% with each purchase, decreasing its ROI. This provides incentive to advance in level in order to unlock additional real estate types that provide a higher ROI.  Online Race or Die Calculators can help one determine which estates they should buy given their bankroll and level.

Codes

In one tab of the game it was possible to enter special codes that would grant the player specific items. One example of these codes was "slipperywhenwet" which would grant the player with special tires.

References

External links 
 www.raceordieonline.com, Official Website

2009 video games
Products and services discontinued in 2013
IOS games
IOS-only games
Massively multiplayer online games
Racing video games
Inactive massively multiplayer online games